Ethel Wales (April 4, 1878 – February 15, 1952) was an American actress who appeared in more than 130 films during her 30-year career.

Biography
Born in 1878 in Passaic, New Jersey, Wales graduated from "Wisconsin university".

Wales had a multifaceted professional relationship with Cecil DeMille and William deMille, beginning with her acting in their plays in the eastern United States. When the brothers moved to Hollywood and began working with films, Wales was their secretary and casting director. In 1927, Cecil De Mille signed her to a long-term contract to act in films. Her first film for Cecil DeMille was The Whispering Chorus (1918).

She was the first wife of Wellington E. Wales, Mary Pickford's business manager during the height of her popularity. The couple had one son, Wellington Charles Wales, an editorial writer for The New York Times, who died of a heart attack shortly after his 19-year-old son Samuel was killed in a train mishap. Ethel's second husband was actor Hal Taliaferro.

On October 23, 1933, Wales married retired businessman John W. Stockton in Yuma, Arizona.

She died February 15, 1952, in Woodland Hills, California at age 73. She is buried at Inglewood Park Cemetery in Inglewood, California.

Partial filmography

Midsummer Madness (1921)
After the Show (1921)
Miss Lulu Bett (1921)
Our Leading Citizen (1922)
The Bonded Woman (1922)
Nice People (1922)
Manslaughter (1922)
The Covered Wagon (1923)
The Marriage Maker (1923)
 Stepping Fast (1923)
Loving Lies (1924)
The White Sin (1924)
 Which Shall It Be? (1924)
 The Wedding Song (1925)
Don't (1925)
The Monster (1925)
The Rag Man (1925)
 Let Women Alone (1925)
 Shattered Lives (1925)
 Go Straight (1925)
Steppin' Out (1925)
Wandering Footsteps (1925)
Made for Love (1926)
Take It from Me (1926)
The Unknown Soldier (1926)
Cradle Snatchers (1927)
 Stage Kisses (1927)
The Satin Woman (1927)
 The Girl in the Pullman (1927)
The Country Doctor (1927)
The Wreck of the Hesperus (1927)
Ladies' Night in a Turkish Bath (1928)
On to Reno (1928)
 The Perfect Crime (1928)
Tenth Avenue (1928)
 Craig's Wife (1928)
Taxi 13 (1928)
The Donovan Affair (1929)
The Saturday Night Kid (1929)
The Dude Wrangler (1930)
 Under Montana Skies (1930)
Tom Sawyer (1930) - Mrs. Harper
The Criminal Code (1931)
Maker of Men (1931)
The Fighting Fool (1932)
Love in High Gear (1932)
The Thirteenth Guest (1932)
A Man's Land (1932)
 The Fighting Parson (1933)
The Important Witness (1933)
 Easy Millions (1933)
The Gladiator (1938)
Smash-Up: The Story of a Woman (1947) (uncredited)

References

External links

Still from The Bedroom Window (1924) with Ethel Wales at gettyimages.com

American silent film actresses
1878 births
1952 deaths
People from Passaic, New Jersey
Actresses from New Jersey
20th-century American actresses